Stockholm County is one of the 29 multi-member constituencies of the Riksdag, the national legislature of Sweden. The constituency was established in 1970 when the Riksdag changed from a bicameral legislature to a unicameral legislature. It is conterminous with the county of Stockholm but excludes Stockholm Municipality which has its own constituency. The constituency currently elects 40 of the 349 members of the Riksdag using the open party-list proportional representation electoral system. At the 2022 general election it had 1,006,456 registered electors.

Electoral system
Stockholm County currently elects 40 of the 349 members of the Riksdag using the open party-list proportional representation electoral system. Constituency seats are allocated using the modified Sainte-Laguë method. Only parties that that reach the 4% national threshold and parties that receive at least 12% of the vote in the constituency compete for constituency seats. Supplementary leveling seats may also be allocated at the constituency level to parties that reach the 4% national threshold.

Election results

Summary

(Excludes leveling seats)

Detailed

2020s

2022
Results of the 2022 general election held on 11 September 2022:

The following candidates were elected:
 Constituency seats - Alireza Akhondi (C), 191 votes; Magdalena Andersson (S), 45,989 votes; Andrea Andersson-Tay (V), 132 votes; Alexandra Anstrell (M), 364 votes; Mats Arkhem (SD), 23 votes; Ludvig Aspling (SD), 90 votes; Gulan Avci (L), 273 votes; Tobias Billström (M), 823 votes; Christian Carlsson (KD), 100 votes; Nooshi Dadgostar (V), 13,796 votes; Mikael Damberg (S), 862 votes; Ida Drougge (M), 651 votes; Karin Enström (M), 530 votes; Jakob Forssmed (KD), 313 votes; Kjell Jansson (M), 297 votes; Martin Kinnunen (SD), 126 votes; Serkan Köse (S), 746 votes; Julia Kronlid (SD), 360 votes; Anna Lasses (C), 127 votes; Amanda Lind (MP), 675 votes; Fredrik Lindahl (SD), 99 votes; Kerstin Lundgren (C), 172 votes; Josefin Malmqvist (M), 572 votes; Ingela Nylund Watz (S), 197 votes; Leif Nysmed (S), 362 votes; Erik Ottoson (M), 309 votes; Daniel Riazat (V), 733 votes; Azadeh Rojhan Gustafsson (S), 405 votes; Magdalena Schröder (M), 271 votes; Markus Selin (S), 366 votes; Anna Starbrink (L), 316 votes; Märta Stenevi (MP), 3,296 votes; Robert Stenkvist (SD), 68 votes; Maria Stockhaus (M), 364 votes; Mathias Tegnér (S), 377 votes; Anna Vikström (S), 366 votes; Alexandra Völker (S), 440 votes; Åsa Westlund (S), 538 votes; Niklas Wykman (M), 403 votes; and Leonid Yurkovskiy (SD), 23 votes.
 Leveling seats - Annika Hirvonen (MP), 339 votes; Fredrik Malm (L), 199 votes; and Beatrice Timgren (SD), 25 votes.

2010s

2018
Results of the 2018 general election held on 9 September 2018:

The following candidates were elected:
 Constituency seats - Alireza Akhondi (C), 160 votes; Erik Andersson (M), 289 votes; Magdalena Andersson (S), 10,205 votes; Alexandra Anstrell (M), 469 votes; Maria Arnholm (L), 369 votes; Ludvig Aspling (SD), 10 votes; Alice Bah Kuhnke (MP), 3,305 votes; Hanif Bali (M), 4,158 votes; Ibrahim Baylan (S), 2,925 votes; Jan Björklund (L), 7,337 votes; Camilla Brodin (KD), 111 votes; Bo Broman (SD), 4 votes; Mikael Damberg (S), 2,054 votes; Lorena Delgado Varas (V), 345 votes; Karin Enström (M), 324 votes; Jakob Forssmed (KD), 247 votes; Gustav Fridolin (MP), 2,882 votes; Ida Gabrielsson (V), 210 votes; Robert Halef (KD), 2,172 votes; Helene Hellmark Knutsson (S), 1,606 votes; Kjell Jansson (M), 306 votes; Amineh Kakabaveh (V), 1,328 votes; Martin Kinnunen (SD), 127 votes; Serkan Köse (S), 2,007 votes; Julia Kronlid (SD), 298 votes; Per Lodenius (C), 235 votes; Kerstin Lundgren (C), 162 votes; Josefin Malmqvist (M), 361 votes; Ingela Nylund Watz (S), 666 votes; Erik Ottoson (M), 219 votes; Robert Stenkvist (SD), 97 votes; Maria Stockhaus (M), 998 votes; Mikael Strandman (SD), 83 votes; Tomas Tobé (M), 361 votes; Alexandra Völker (S), 796 votes; Barbro Westerholm (L), 633 votes; Åsa Westlund (S), 1,217 votes; and Niklas Wykman (M), 313 votes.
 Leveling seats - Ida Drougge (M), 416 votes; Fredrik Lindahl (SD), 34 votes; Karolina Skog (MP), 568 votes; and Mathias Tegnér (S), 848 votes.

2014
Results of the 2014 general election held on 14 September 2014:

The following candidates were elected:
 Constituency seats - Erik Andersson (M), 185 votes; Magdalena Andersson (S), 4,529 votes; Maria Arnholm (FP), 725 votes; Anti Avsan (M), 136 votes; Hanif Bali (M), 395 votes; Ibrahim Baylan (S), 5,945 votes; Jan Björklund (FP), 5,282 votes; Ewa Björling (M), 171 votes; Nooshi Dadgostar (V), 180 votes; Mikael Damberg (S), 6,459 votes; Esabelle Dingizian (MP), 296 votes; Ida Drougge (M), 381 votes; Catharina Elmsäter-Svärd (M), 626 votes; Hillevi Engström (M), 190 votes; Karin Enström (M), 224 votes; Ali Esbati (V), 788 votes; Sofia Fölster (M), 445 votes; Jakob Forssmed (KD), 145 votes; Robert Halef (KD), 2,521 votes; Roger Hedlund (SD), 6 votes; Carina Herrstedt (SD), 94 votes; Annika Hirvonen Falk (MP), 409 votes; Yilmaz Kerimo (S), 1,868 votes; Anna Kinberg Batra (M), 705 votes; Julia Kronlid (SD), 106 votes; Per Lodenius (C), 710 votes; Kerstin Lundgren (C), 861 votes; Ingela Nylund Watz (S), 899 votes; Leif Nysmed (S), 1,119 votes; Göran Pettersson (M), 137 votes; Carl Schlyter (MP), 495 votes; Björn Söder (SD), 151 votes; Maria Stockhaus (M), 316 votes; Björn von Sydow (S), 1,724 votes; Alexandra Völker (S), 944 votes; Barbro Westerholm (FP), 661 votes; Åsa Westlund (S), 1,717 votes; and Niklas Wykman (M), 283 votes.
 Leveling seats - Emma Henriksson (KD), 488 votes.

2010
Results of the 2010 general election held on 19 September 2010:

The following candidates were elected:
 Constituency seats - Anti Avsan (M), 177 votes; Hanif Bali (M), 363 votes; Jan Björklund (FP), 7,165 votes; Ewa Björling (M), 407 votes; Thomas Bodström (S), 16,807 votes; Mikael Damberg (S), 797 votes; Esabelle Dingizian (MP), 225 votes; Kent Ekeroth (SD),107 votes; Hillevi Engström (M), 607 votes; Karin Enström (M), 219 votes; Peter Eriksson (MP), 3,355 votes; Mats Gerdau (M), 183 votes; Isabella Jernbeck (M), 232 votes; Amineh Kakabaveh (V), 342 votes; Anna Kinberg Batra (M), 474 votes; Per Lodenius (C), 794 votes; Malin Löfsjögård (M), 216 votes; Kerstin Lundgren (C), 928 votes; Nina Lundström (FP), 353 votes; Carina Moberg (S), 911 votes; Ingela Nylund Watz (S), 820 votes; Mats Odell (KD), 536 votes; Lars Ohly (V), 5,244 votes; Désirée Pethrus Engström (KD), 136 votes; Göran Pettersson (M), 259 votes; Marietta de Pourbaix-Lundin (M), 151 votes; Eliza Roszkowska Öberg (M), 242 votes; Nyamko Sabuni (FP), 1,787 votes; Mikael Sandström (M), 85 votes; Fredrik Schulte (M), 162 votes; Karl Sigfrid (M), 179 votes; Björn Söder (SD), 99 votes; Björn von Sydow (S), 1,601 votes; Mikaela Valtersson (MP), 750 votes; Tommy Waidelich (S), 388 votes; Maryam Yazdanfar (S), 1,440 votes; and Christina Zedell (S), 895 votes.
 Leveling seats - Emma Henriksson (KD), 407 votes.

2000s

2006
Results of the 2006 general election held on 17 September 2006:

The following candidates were elected:
 Constituency seats - Anti Avsan (M), 186 votes; Christina Axelsson (S), 467 votes; Ewa Björling (M), 197 votes; Maria Borelius (M), 1,524 votes; Josefin Brink (V), 115 votes; Mikael Damberg (S), 628 votes; Inger Davidson (KD), 1,530 votes; Catharina Elmsäter-Svärd (M), 613 votes; Hillevi Engström (M), 372 votes; Karin Enström (M), 230 votes; Mats Gerdau (M), 251 votes; Björn Hamilton (M), 189 votes; Yilmaz Kerimo (S), 3,072 votes; Anna Kinberg Batra (M), 349 votes; Lars Leijonborg (FP), 6,085 votes; Göran Lennmarker (M), 62 votes; Lennart Levi (C), 547 votes; Kerstin Lundgren (C), 846 votes; Carina Moberg (S), 753 votes; Nils Oskar Nilsson (M), 169 votes; Pär Nuder (S), 4,387 votes; Mats Odell (KD), 1,508 votes; Lars Ohly (V), 4,231 votes; Mats Pertoft (MP), 549 votes; Göran Pettersson (M), 422 votes; Karin Pilsäter (FP), 942 votes; Marietta de Pourbaix-Lundin (M), 236 votes; Mona Sahlin (S), 9,889 votes; Karl Sigfrid (M), 183 votes; Ingvar Svensson (KD), 111 votes; Björn von Sydow (S), 1,538 votes; Mikaela Valtersson (MP), 873 votes; Tommy Waidelich (S), 287 votes; Barbro Westerholm (FP), 828 votes; Maryam Yazdanfar (S), 943 votes; and Christina Zedell (S), 929 votes.
 Leveling seats - Gunnar Andrén (FP), 156 votes; Isabella Jernbeck (M), 184 votes; Per Lodenius (C), 549 votes; Esabelle Reshdouni (MP), 262 votes; Fredrik Schulte (M), 310 votes; and Rune Wikström (M), 309 votes.

2002
Results of the 2002 general election held on 15 September 2002:

The following candidates were elected:
 Constituency seats - Martin Andreasson (FP), 259 votes; Gunnar Andrén (FP), 199 votes; Lars Ångström (MP), 836 votes; Eva Arvidsson (S), 606 votes; Helena Bargholtz (FP), 448 votes; Cinnika Beiming (S), 850 votes; Mikael Damberg (S), 745 votes; Inger Davidson (KD), 342 votes; Catharina Elmsäter-Svärd (M), 1,529 votes; Hillevi Engström (M), 1,279 votes; Karin Enström (M), 947 votes; Mia Franzén (FP),  235 votes; Carl B. Hamilton (FP), 1,336 votes; Chris Heister (M), 6,801 votes; Anita Johansson (S), 406 votes;  Yilmaz Kerimo (S), 2,721 votes; Lars Leijonborg (FP), 18,107 votes; Göran Lennmarker (M), 545 votes; Kerstin Lundgren (C), 611 votes; Carina Moberg (S), 843 votes; Pär Nuder (S), 467 votes; Mats Odell (KD), 264 votes; Sermin Özürküt (V), 256 votes; Karin Pilsäter (FP), 1,494 votes; Marietta de Pourbaix-Lundin (M), 666 votes; Ola Rask (S), 372 votes; Fredrik Reinfeldt (M), 3,517 votes; Mona Sahlin (S), 9,943 votes; Gudrun Schyman (V), 10,217 votes; Ingvar Svensson (KD), 59 votes; Björn von Sydow (S), 1,579 votes; Ingela Thalén (S), 7,681 votes; Mikaela Valtersson (MP), 260 votes; Tommy Waidelich (S), 775 votes; and Henrik Westman (M), 453 votes.
 Leveling seats - Christina Axelsson (S), 368 votes; Ewa Björling (M), 719 votes; Mats Einarsson (V), 47 votes; and Nina Lundström (FP), 177 votes.

1990s

1998
Results of the 1998 general election held on 20 September 1998:

The following candidates were elected:
 Constituency seats - Eva Arvidsson (S), 748 votes; Cinnika Beiming (S), 793 votes; Knut Billing (M), 278 votes; Lennart Daléus (C), 2,602 votes; Inger Davidson (KD), 870 votes; Catharina Elmsäter-Svärd (M), 1,318 votes; Karin Enström (M), 1,425 votes; Amanda Grönlund (KD), 231 votes; Catharina Hagen (M), 1,058 votes; Chris Heister (M), 4,115 votes; Ulla Hoffmann (V), 2,151 votes; Gunnar Hökmark (M), 4,182 votes; Anita Johansson (S), 751 votes; Eva Johansson (S), 857 votes; Kenneth Kvist (V), 1,299 votes; Kalle Larsson (V), 335 votes; Lars Leijonborg (FP), 4,209 votes; Sören Lekberg (S), 652 votes; Göran Lennmarker (M), 233 votes; Gudrun Lindvall (MP), 983 votes; Jerry Martinger (M), 1,925 votes; Carina Moberg (S), 986 votes; Pär Nuder (S), 326 votes; Mats Odell (KD), 387 votes; Karin Pilsäter (FP), 1,758 votes; Marietta de Pourbaix-Lundin (M), 931 votes; Ola Rask (S), 420 votes; Fredrik Reinfeldt (M), 2,861 votes; Stig Rindborg (M), 572 votes; Ingvar Svensson (KD), 43 votes; Björn von Sydow (S), 1,574 votes; Ingela Thalén (S), 12,230 votes; Lars Tobisson (M), 10,342 votes; and Tommy Waidelich (S), 872 votes.
 Leveling seats - Lars Ångström (MP), 1,012 votes; Carl B. Hamilton (FP), 1,122 votes; Inger Strömbom (KD), 77 votes; and Henrik Westman (M), 853 votes.

1994
Results of the 1994 general election held on 18 September 1994:

1991
Results of the 1991 general election held on 15 September 1991:

1980s

1988
Results of the 1988 general election held on 18 September 1988:

1985
Results of the 1985 general election held on 15 September 1985:

1982
Results of the 1982 general election held on 19 September 1982:

1970s

1979
Results of the 1979 general election held on 16 September 1979:

1976
Results of the 1976 general election held on 19 September 1976:

1973
Results of the 1973 general election held on 16 September 1973:

1970
Results of the 1970 general election held on 20 September 1970:

References

Riksdag constituencies
Riksdag constituencies established in 1970
Riksdag constituency